Roy Roberts (1906-1975) was an American character actor.

Roy Roberts may also refer to:

 Roy A. Roberts (1887–1967), Kansas City Star editor
 Roy Michael Roberts (1952–1999), controversial inmate executed in Missouri
 Roy Roberts (blues artist) (born 1943), North Carolina blues artist
 Roy Roberts (baseball), pitcher in the Negro leagues
 Roy Roberts (chief executive) (born 1939), African-American businessman and former vice-president of General Motors
 Roy Roberts (inventor), inventor of the carpet gripper rod or tack strip